Hastijan (also Romanized as Hastījān; also known as Hashtījān) is a village in Hastijan Rural District, in the Central District of Delijan County, Markazi Province, Iran. At the 2006 census, its population was 307, in 99 families.

References 

Populated places in Delijan County